Percival Albert Whitton (14 January 1892 – 9 October 1974) was an English professional footballer who played as a full back and centre forward in the Football League for Brentford and Newport County.

Career statistics

References

1892 births
Sportspeople from Taunton
English footballers
English Football League players
Association football fullbacks
Brentford F.C. players
Association football forwards
Bristol Rovers F.C. players
Newport County A.F.C. players
Southern Football League players
Taunton Town F.C. players
1974 deaths
Bridgend Town A.F.C. players